Övörkhangai (Öwörhangai; "southern Khangai") is one of the 21 aimags (provinces) of Mongolia, located in the south of the country. Its capital is Arvaikheer.

The Shankh Monastery, one of the oldest and most important monasteries, is located in this province, as well as Erdene Zuu monastery and Tövkhön Monastery. Karakorum, the ancient capital of the Mongol Empire was located adjacent to the Erdene Zuu monastery.

Övörkhangai Provincee held its first Special Olympics games events in 2015.

Transportation 
The Arvaikheer Airport (AVK/ZMAH) has one unpaved runway and is served by regular flights to Ulaanbaatar and Altai.

Bus travels from Arvaikheer to Ulaanbaatar every day.

Administrative subdivisions

References

External links 

 
Provinces of Mongolia
States and territories established in 1931
1931 establishments in Mongolia